Patricia Cardenas (born August 19, 1984) is an American water polo player. She played for Bell Gardens High School, Golden West College, University of Southern California, and the United States national water polo team. She won a silver medal with the U.S. at the 2008 Summer Olympics.

Career

High school
Cardenas attended Bell Gardens High School, where she played water polo for four years and won four CIF Division III championships. She was a first team All-American three times.

College
Cardenas played water polo for Golden West College. In 2002, the team won the state championship, and Cardenas was named the California Community College MVP.

Cardenas later transferred to the University of Southern California. In 2006, her first season with the Trojans, she ranked third on the team with 40 goals. She was an All-American honorable mention. She took a leave of absence from USC to train with the national team.

International
Cardenas made the U.S. senior national team after attending open tryouts in 2006. In 2007, she scored four goals in the FINA World Championships, four goals in the FINA World League Super Final, and three goals in the Pan American Games; the U.S. finished first in all three tournaments. At the 2008 Summer Olympics, Cardenas scored two goals, helping the U.S. win the silver medal.

Personal
Cardenas was born in Commerce, California. She has two brothers and her family is of Mexican descent.

See also
 List of Olympic medalists in water polo (women)
 List of world champions in women's water polo
 List of World Aquatics Championships medalists in water polo

References

External links
 

1984 births
Living people
American female water polo players
American sportspeople of Mexican descent
Olympic silver medalists for the United States in water polo
Water polo players at the 2008 Summer Olympics
USC Trojans women's water polo players
Sportspeople from California
People from Commerce, California
Medalists at the 2008 Summer Olympics
World Aquatics Championships medalists in water polo